Francis Davies may refer to:
Francis Davies (bishop) (1605–1675), Welsh bishop
Francis Davies (British Army officer) (1864–1948), British general
Francis James Davies (1889–1941), flying ace
Francis James Saunders Davies (1937–2018), Welsh bishop in the Anglican church

See also
Frank Davies (disambiguation)
Francis Davis (disambiguation)